The Chute Pond Dam is located in Mountain, Wisconsin. It was added to the National Register of Historic Places in 2010.

History
The dam was built by the Works Progress Administration of the New Deal. It is located on the site of an old log dam.

References

Dams on the National Register of Historic Places in Wisconsin
Dams in Wisconsin
Buildings and structures in Oconto County, Wisconsin
Works Progress Administration in Wisconsin
Dams completed in 1937
National Register of Historic Places in Oconto County, Wisconsin